The Kumamoto Band was a group of Christian men educated at the Kumamoto Yogakko by Leroy Lansing Janes. Alongside the Sapporo Band and the Yokohama Band, the members of the Kumamoto Band became an influential Protestant Christian group in Meiji era Japan.

History 
The Kumamoto Yogakko, a school of Western studies in Kumamoto, Japan, was founded by Leroy Lansing Janes in 1871. Janes was recommended for the position by Guido Verbeck. Many of the students came from former samurai families, and had entered the school in an attempt to regain their former status that was lost with the abolition of the feudal system in 1868. After the students became proficient in English, Janes began teaching them about Christianity in 1874. He converted 35 students. In January 1876 the students climbed to the top of Mount Hanaoka and signed the Hanaoka Pledge, a confirmation of their faith. The conversion of these students is attributed to the loss of the system of morality that was a part of the feudal system. 

In 1877 the school was closed by the Meiji government, and many of the students moved on to Doshisha University, where nine more students were added to the band. Many of the students went on to become missionaries and politicians.

Notable members 

 Ebina Danjo
 
 Harada Tasuku
 
 
 
 Kanamori Michitomo
 
 Kozaki Hiromichi
 Kurahara Korehiro
 
 
 
 
 
 Shimomura Kotaro
 Tokutomi Sohō
 
 
 
 Yokoi Tokio

References 

Japanese Protestants